Trichoceraea is a genus of moths of the family Crambidae. It contains only one species, Trichoceraea semperi, which is found in the Philippines.

References

Pyraustinae
Crambidae genera
Monotypic moth genera